Multifocal and accommodating intraocular lenses are artificial intraocular lenses (IOLs) that are designed to provide focus of both distance and near objects, in contrast to monofocal intraocular lenses which only have one focal point and correct distance vision. The issue of restoring accommodation following cataract surgery or through refractive lens exchange is becoming an increasingly important topic in ophthalmology.

Intraocular lenses that correct presbyopia are divided into two main categories:

 Multifocal IOLs: achieve near and distance vision by having two (bifocal) or three (trifocal) focal points simultaneously. The function of multifocal IOL depends on the pupil size for refractive types. The concept is based on the principle that the pupil tends to constrict for near tasks, so the central portion of the lens is designed for near and the outer portion for distance. For diffractive types of multifocal IOLs, light is split by diffraction and the vision is pupil independent.
 Accommodating IOLs: change in shape and power when the ciliary muscle contracts gives an advantage over regular IOLs.

Evidence about different lenses 

Monofocal lenses are standard lenses used in cataract surgery. People who have a multifocal intraocular lens after their cataract is removed may be less likely to need additional glasses compared with people who have standard monofocal lenses. People receiving multifocal lenses may experience more visual problems, such as glare or haloes (rings around lights), than with monofocal lenses.

People receiving accommodative intraocular lenses had improvements in near vision but these improvements were small and reduced over time. People who received accommodative intraocular lenses may have a higher risk of thickening and clouding of the tissue behind the intraocular lenses (posterior capsule opacification) but there is some uncertainty around this finding.

References

Corrective lenses
Vision